Meropi Tzoufi (born 10 October 1956) is a Greek politician who has served as a member of the Hellenic Parliament since 2015. Born in Ioannina, she graduated from the National and Kapodistrian University of Athens's Medical School in 1983. While a student there, she joined the Communist Youth of Greece, and was also part of the Communist Party of Greece in the 1980s. She is married to economist Evangelos Makarios, and has two daughters, making her home with them in Ioannina in 1985.

After graduating from university, Tzoufi worked as a doctor in Konitsa, then was a pediatric specialist in Ioannina. In the 1990s, she became a curator for Greece's National Healthcare Service and worked as a curator. In 2003, she became a lecturer at the University of Ioannina, then was an assistant professor in the Pediatric Health department from 2006 to 2012. She also served as a board member on the Greek Pediatric Neurology Society. In the January 2015 Greek elections, the Syriza party won four of five seats in Ioannina; as one of the founding members of the party, Tzoufi was given one of the seats. She was re-elected in the September 2015 elections, and has held the position since. She serves on the Cultural and Educational Affairs and the Social Affairs committees, as well as the special committee on Equality, Youth and Human Rights.

References

1956 births
Living people
Greek MPs 2015 (February–August)
Greek MPs 2015–2019
Women members of the Hellenic Parliament
Syriza politicians
People from Ioannina
Greek MPs 2019–2023